American Thunder is a weekly television show on the Speed (TV channel) focusing on American V-twin choppers, including the bikes, parts, lifestyle and culture. The longtime host of American Thunder was Michele Smith.  The show has recently been revised with new hosts.

References 

Motorcycle television series
Speed (TV network) original programming